Basidiobolomycetes is one of the currently recognized classes within the kingdom Fungi, and subdivision Basidiobolomycotina.

Taxonomy
Based on the work of Philippe Silar, and "The Mycota: A Comprehensive Treatise on Fungi as Experimental Systems for Basic and Applied Research" and synonyms from "Part 1- Virae, Prokarya, Protists, Fungi".
 Class Basidiobolomycetes Doweld 2001 [Basidiobolomycota Doweld 2001]
 Order Basidiobolales Jacz. & P.A. Jacz. 1931
 Family Basidiobolaceae Engler & Gilg 1924
 Genus Drechslerosporium 
 Genus Schizangiella Dwyer et al. 2006
 Genus Basidiobolus Eidam 1886 [Amphoromorpha Thaxter 1914]

References

Fungus classes
Entomophthoromycota